Natalia Alaverdian is the creator of the A.W.A.K.E. Mode fashion line.

She was raised in Belgium and has  studios in both Antwerp, Belgium and London, England.

References

External links

Natalia Alaverdian Interview

Living people
Harper's Bazaar
Belgian businesspeople in fashion
Year of birth missing (living people)